Apollonius (floruit 460) was an East Roman consul in 460 AD.

He could be identified with that Apollonius who was praetorian prefect of the East in 442–443, or with that Apollonius who was magister militum in 443–451.

Bibliography 

 

5th-century Byzantine people
5th-century Roman consuls
Imperial Roman consuls